Poasa Waqanibau (born 24 March 1994) is a Fijian professional rugby union player. He plays as a winger for the Calvisano in Italian Top10.

Waqainbau previously, in 2018 and 2019, played for Canterbury in the Mitre 10 Cup and Fijian Drua in the NRC. 
From 2020 to 2022 he played for the New England Free Jacks in Major League Rugby (MLR).

He also played for Fiji under-20s.

References

1994 births
Living people
Fijian rugby union players
Fijian Drua players
New England Free Jacks players
Canterbury rugby union players
Rugby union centres
Rugby union wings